Supermouse may refer to:

Supermouse, a mouse with superpowers who appears in comic books published by Standard Comics
Super Mouse was also the original name of Mighty Mouse
Metabolic supermice, bio-genetically modified mice
Super Mouse, an arcade game created by Taito in 1982